The Alfonso Reyes International Prize is a Mexican award given for meritorious lifetime contributions to literary research and criticism. It was founded in 1972 by the economist turned author/critic, Francisco Zendejas and was named in honor of Alfonso Reyes, a well-known Mexican literary critic, author and poet.

Since its creation, the prize has been awarded by the Instituto Nacional de Bellas Artes (INBA), in cooperation with the Consejo Nacional para la Cultura y las Artes (Conaculta), the Sociedad Alfonsina Internacional, the government of Nuevo León, the Universidad Autónoma de Nuevo León, the Universidad Regiomontana and the Instituto Tecnológico de Monterrey.

The first award was presented in 1973. No awards were given from 1996-1999.

Recipients

1973: Jorge Luis Borges 
1974: Marcel Bataillon 
1975: Alejo Carpentier 
1976: André Malraux 
1977: Jorge Guillén 
1978: James Willis Robb
1979: Carlos Fuentes 
1980: Ernesto Mejía Sánchez 
1981: Jacques Soustelle 
1982: José Luis Martínez Rodríguez 
1983: Paulette Patout
1984: Rubén Bonifaz Nuño 
1985: Octavio Paz
1986: Alí Chumacero 
1987: Gutierre Tibón 
1988: Ramón Xirau 
1989: Laurette Séjourné
1990: Adolfo Bioy Casares 
1991: Andrés Henestrosa 
1992: Arnaldo Orfila Reynal 
1993: Joaquín Díez-Canedo  
1994: Germán Arciniegas 
1995: Juan José Arreola 
2000: Arturo Uslar Pietri 
2001: Miguel León-Portilla 
2002: Rafael Gutiérrez Girardot
2003: Harold Bloom 
2004: José Emilio Pacheco
2005: Antonio Candido
2006: Margit Frenk
2007: George Steiner
2008: Ernesto de la Peña
2009: Alfonso Rangel Guerra
2010: Mario Vargas Llosa
2011: Eduardo Lizalde
2012: Ignacio Bosque
2013: Fernando del Paso
2017: Alberto Manguel
2019: Herbert S. Klein

Notes

References

Mexican literary awards
Awards established in 1972